"Money" is the ninth single by British pop rock band Lawson. The single was released as the third single (first excl. Lawson EP) from their upcoming second album Perspective, set to release on 8 July 2016. The music video for "Money" was released on 4 February 2016. The single was released on 18 March 2016, via Polydor Records. "The song "Money" was written in a time when the band had none." - It was revealed that Lawson wrote the song years before whilst touring in a van, struggling to find gigs. The song is said to be revamped for 2016.

Music video
The music video for "Money" was directed by Carly Cussen. The video shows the foursome rocking it out in a pillared room and then having fun and performing in a party with guests.

Sound
"Money" differs in sound to the rest of the material previously unveiled (as Lawson EP) from their upcoming album. The new single features a hint of reggae in addition to their pop rock sound, similar to "Juliet".

Development
Lead singer Andy Brown said about the single:
We first had the idea of Money when we were unsigned and touring around in an old van, absolutely skint. We used to sing 'Where’s the money?!' after driving 100s of miles to play to 10 people!

After the success of the first album, we developed it further and it just turned into this big, pop anthem. It's going to be a big favourite in the live set- we shot the video last week and invited a bunch of our friends and fans down to be in it and they were all singing along after the first listen.

Critical reception
Lewis Corner of Digital Spy said this about their new single:
British pop-rockers Lawson are back with a big new track ahead of the release of their second studio album.

The four-piece will officially release 'Money' as their new single on March 18, but it's available to stream on Spotify and Apple Music now.

And they're crooning about something we can all relate to - being skint.

Track listing

 Digital Download - Single
 "Money" - 2:51

 Digital Download - EP
 "Money (7th Heaven Radio Edit)" - 3:47
 "Money (7th Heaven Club Mix)" - 5:28
 "Money (Cosmic Dawn Radio Edit)" - 3:29
 "Money (Cosmic Dawn Club Mix)" - 4:03
 "Money (Acoustic)" - 2:57

 CD
 "Money" - 2:51
 "Money (Instrumental)" - 2:51

 Acoustic CD
 "Money (Acoustic)" - 2:57
 "Mountain (Live Session)" - 3:45

 Remixes CD
 "Money (7th Heaven Radio Edit)" - 3:47
 "Money (Cosmic Dawn Radio Edit)" - 3:29
 "Money (7th Heaven Club Mix)" - 5:28

 Remix MP3
 "Money (Cosmic Dawn Club Mix)" - 4:03

Credits and personnel

"Money" and "Money (Instrumental)"
Recorded at Blackbird Studio
Mixed at Beach Studio, London
Mastered at The Lodge, New York
Andy Brown – vocals, guitar and songwriter
Ryan Fletcher – bass and vocals
Joel Peat - guitar and vocals
Adam Pitts - drum and percussion
Joen Fields - keyboards, percussion, programming, engineer and producer
Duck Blackwell - keyboards and producer
Ki Fitzferald - songwriter
Matt Schwartz - songwriter
James F. Reynolds - mixer
Ernesto Olvera - engineer
Emily Lazar - engineer

"Money (Acoustic)"
Mastered at Soundtrap Mastering, London
Lawson - all instrumentals
Jeremy Cooper - engineer

"Mountain (Live Session)"
Recorded at The Pool Studio, London
Mastered at Soundtrap Mastering, London
Andy Brown - vocals, guitars, songwriter
Joel Peat - guitars
Adam Pitts - drums
Ryan Fletcher - bass
Ki Fitzferald - songwriter
Matt Schwartz - songwriter
Eric Turner - songwriter
Dan Frampton - mixer
Jeremy Cooper - engineer

"Money (7th Heaven Radio Edit)" and "Money (7th Heaven Club Edit)"
Jon Dixon (7th Heaven Productions) - remix, additional producer
Andy Wetson (7th Heaven Productions) - remix, additional producer

"Money (Cosmic Dawn Radio Edit)" and "Money (Cosmic Dawn Club Edit)"
Bjorn Bung (Cosmic Dawn) - remix, additional producer

Credits adapted from the liner notes of "Money" CDs.

References

2016 songs
2016 singles
Lawson (band) songs
Songs written by Ki Fitzgerald
Songs written by Matt Schwartz